Die Feuerzangenbowle is a 1970 West German film based on the book of the same name and a remake of the 1934 and 1944 films. It was much less successful than its predecessors.

Cast
Walter Giller as Dr. Hans Pfeiffer
Uschi Glas as Eva Knauer
Theo Lingen as Professor Crey
Fritz Tillmann as Direktor Knauer
Willy Reichert as Professor Bömmel
Hans Richter as Dr. Brett
Rudolf Schündler as Musiklehrer
Helen Vita as Frau Windscheid
Nadja Tiller as Marion Xylander
Wolfgang Condrus as Husemann
Alice Treff as Frau Knauer
Herbert Weißbach as Oberschulrat Hinzelmann
Willi Rose as Klemke
Karl-Josef Cramer as Rosen
Hans-Werner Bussinger as Knebel

References

External links

1970 films
1970 comedy films
1970s German-language films
German comedy films
West German films
Films directed by Helmut Käutner
Films based on works by Heinrich Spoerl
Films based on German novels
Films about educators
Films set in schools
Films set in the 1920s
Remakes of German films
1970s German films